Bar River Water Aerodrome  is located  southwest of Bar River, Ontario, Canada.

See also
Bar River Airport

References

Registered aerodromes in Algoma District
Seaplane bases in Ontario